Acrobotrys is a monotypic genus of flowering plants in the family Rubiaceae. It was described by Karl Moritz Schumann and Kurt Krause in 1908. The sole species is Acrobotrys discolor, which is endemic to Colombia.

References

Monotypic Rubiaceae genera
Endemic flora of Colombia